Marian Liviu Drăghiceanu (born 7 July 1999) is a Romanian professional footballer who plays as a midfielder for Liga III club CSM Reșița.

Club career

Ceahlăul Piatra Neamț
Drăghiceanu made his Liga I debut at 15 years, 10 months and 10 days, at that time being the 4th youngest debutant (now being 9th). Formed by Ceahlăul Piatra Neamț, Drăghiceanu saw him without a team when Ceahlaul went bankrupt in 2016. For 1 year Drăghiceanu has given evidence of playing to several teams from Italy, but nothing concrete has been achieved and in the summer of 2017 he signed with Dunărea Călărași.

Honours
Dunărea Călărași
Liga II: 2017–18

Rapid București
Liga III: 2018–19

CSM Reșița
Liga III: 2021–22

References

External links
 
 

1999 births
Living people
People from Neamț County
Romanian footballers
Association football midfielders
Liga I players
Liga II players
Liga III players
CSM Ceahlăul Piatra Neamț players
FC Dunărea Călărași players
FC Rapid București players
CSM Reșița players